Luci (lantern) is a LED rechargeable lantern powered by sunlight. The device is inflatable, collapsible, and waterproof, and comprises 10 LED white lights with several settings. The solar-powered artifact became part of a joint campaign with Direct Energy to provide access to lighting to various international rural areas that lack access to electricity.

History
 
Luci (lantern) was invented by Jason Alan Snyder in 2012, whom co-founded MPOWERD the manufacturer of Luci. 
 
The original device consists of an inflatable LED lantern rechargeable by solar light. There are various models of Luci on the market today. Depending on the specific model, they generally take 7-25 hours of direct sunlight to charge and are able to provide 6-50 hours of light depending on the light mode and model

Luci lantern has multiple patents, including patents for an inflatable solar lamp design and portable solar-powered devices.

Current Models
 
 Build-Your-Own Luci: Solar Light Kit
 Luci Outdoor 2.0
 Luci Lux
 Luci Color Essence
 Luci Color
 Luci Original
 Luci EMRG
 Luci Candle
 Luci Color Essence Mini Trio
 Luci Essence
 Luci Pro Series: Outdoor 2.0
 Luci Pro Series: Lux
 Luci Base Light
 Luci Core
 Luci String Lights
 Luci Color String Lights
 Luci Bike Light Set
 Luci Beam
 Luci Explore (Speaker + Light)
 Build-Your-Own Luci: Solar Light Kit

See also
 
 Direct Energy
 Solar lamp

References

External links
 MPOWERED Website

Solar-powered devices